Ham's Restaurant was a restaurant chain based in North Carolina and Virginia.

History
Ham's was started in Greensboro, North Carolina in 1935. In 1984, Charlie Erwin acquired the original property. The business was expanded into the North Carolina and Southern Virginia region, and eventually comprised more than 20 restaurants under the Ham's logo.
In 2009 the company filed for bankruptcy and was eventually sold at an auction. The new owners continued the business but changed parts of the business model, closed a lot of locations and opened new ones with different concepts. The last location in High Point, North Carolina closed down in 2022 due to short-staffing, effectively ending the chain.

Former locations
Florida
 Jacksonville, FL

North Carolina
 Asheville, NC 
 Burlington, NC 
 Chapel Hill, NC 
 Greensboro, NC- 4 locations
 Hickory, North Carolina 
 High Point, NC- 2 locations 
 Kernersville, NC 
 Shelby, NC 
 Winston-Salem, NC

Virginia
 Danville, VA 
 Harrisonburg, VA 
 Lynchburg, VA

Entertainment
Ham's provided entertainment including live music, karaoke and NTN trivia.

Notes
 Ham's menu
 accessmylibrary.com

References

External links
 www.hamsrestaurants.com

Companies based in Greensboro, North Carolina
Restaurants in North Carolina
Economy of the Southeastern United States
Regional restaurant chains in the United States
Restaurants established in 1935
1935 establishments in North Carolina
2022 disestablishments in North Carolina